Abdulla Kurd (sometimes Abdullah Kurd, and also known as Abdullah al-Kurdi or Salahuddin), (born Doger Sevdet; 1977–2011), was a Kurdish Islamist militant fighting in Chechnya. Kurd was the top deputy to Saudi-born field commander Muhannad. Following Muhannad's capture and assassination near the village of Serzhen-Yurt on 21 April 2011, according to the Russian National Anti-Terrorist Committee, Kurd assumed Muhannad's position. Kurd was killed by Russian security forces in the Cheberloevsky area of Chechnya on 3 May 2011.

Early life and rebel activity

Little is known of Kurd's early life, but he is said to have been born in the Kurdish region of Turkey, probably in the Diyarbakır area. He would have traveled from his native village to the North Caucasus in 1999 after transiting through the Pankisi Gorge in Georgia. Russian intelligence claims that Kurd fought in the battalion of foreign fighters led by Ibn al-Khattab during the Second Chechen War, and was closely involved in planning and organizing large-scale acts of sabotage and terrorism throughout the region. He established a close connection with the Saudi mujahid Abu al-Walid until al-Walid was killed in 2004. Following Abu Hafs al-Urduni's death in 2006 and Muhannad's promotion to the post of Emir of foreign fighters in Chechnya, Kurd became deputy chief emissary for al-Qaeda in the North Caucasus, according to Russia's National Anti-terrorism Committee (NAK).

At his death Turkish and Georgian identity papers, belonging to "Cevdet Döğer", were found in Kurd's baggage, which were released by the Russian Government soon afterwards. However, the Turkish and Georgian governments both stated that there was not such a person registered in their databases, which means that the documents are likely to be false. The indicated date of birth, April 20,1977, also was very doubtful because this would mean that he joined the battle at the age of 14.

Death

Kurd was killed on 3 May 2011 in a special operation near the village of Sharo-Argun, in the Cheberloevsky area of Chechnya. According to the Russian NAK, a contingent of pro-Moscow Chechen Federal Security Service (FSB) troops along with Russian Ministry of Internal Affairs (MVD) forces conducting search and reconnaissance activities in forested, mountainous terrain came across Kurd and a Dagestani militant; both were killed in the ensuing skirmish.

A rebel account of Kurd's death released nearly two years later offered new information. According to Kavkaz Center, Russian forces located and surrounded a small rebel base acting on a tip from Beslan Algiriyev, an FSB plant in the militant ranks.  Four fighters were present at the encampment: killed alongside Kurd was a 24-year-old Dagestani identified as Ramazan Bartiyev, while two others identified as Aburayk Yusupkhadzhiyev and Isa Vagapov were wounded but escaped the encirclement (only later to be killed alongside Khuseyn Gakayev in January 2013). Algiriyev's status as an agent of the FSB was eventually discovered, and he was executed on 22 August 2011.

Kurd's Turkish passport containing visas to Georgia, Azerbaijan, and Pakistan was recovered at the scene and later displayed via Russian news outlets.

See also
 Chechen mujahideen

References

External links 
 : Russia sees vindication of its killing practices in the death of Osama bin Laden
 
 

1977 births
Turkish Kurdish people
Caucasus Emirate members
Foreign volunteers in Chechnya
2011 deaths
Islamic terrorism in Russia